The Chinese Ambassador to Sudan is the official representative of the People's Republic of China to the Republic of the Sudan.

List of representatives

See also
China–Sudan relations

References 

 
Sudan
China